Phalombe is a district in the Southern Region of Malawi. The capital is Phalombe. The district covers an area of 1,394 km.² and has a population of 231,990.

Demographics
At the time of the 2018 Census of Malawi, the distribution of the population of Phalombe District by ethnic group was as follows:
94.8% Lomwe
 3.4% Nyanja
 0.5% Chewa
 0.4% Yao
 0.3% Mang'anja
 0.2% Ngoni
 0.1% Tumbuka
 0.1% Sena
 0.1% Tonga
 0.0% Nkhonde
 0.0% Lambya
 0.0% Sukwa
 0.0% Others

Government and administrative divisions

There are five National Assembly constituencies in Phalombe:

 Phalombe - Central
 Phalombe - East
 Phalombe - North
 Phalombe - North East
 Phalombe - South

Since the 2009 election all of these constituencies have been held by members of the Democratic Progressive Party.

References

 
Districts of Malawi
Districts in Southern Region, Malawi